is a Japanese actress and voice actress who is affiliated with Seinenza Theater Company.

Live appearances

TV drama
Chūgakusei Nikki
Oshin

Voice roles

Anime television series
A Spirit of the Sun (Mrs Xia)
AD Police (Nancy Wilson)
Master Keaton (Doris Goldman)
Rent-A-Girlfriend (Nagomi Kinoshita)
Scrapped Princess (Baroness Bailaha)
Seven of Seven (Headmistress)
Tenchi Muyo! GXP (Seto Kamiki Jurai)

Game
James Bond 007: Everything or Nothing (Dr. Katya Nadanova)
Vampire Hunter D (Carmila)

Dubbing

Live-action
Annika (DI Annika Strandhed (Nicola Walker))
The Assignment (Carla (Céline Bonnier))
Avatar: The Way of Water (General Frances Ardmore (Edie Falco))
Babylon A.D. (Sister Rebeka (Michelle Yeoh))
Blood Work (Detective Jaye Winston (Tina Lifford))
Bridesmaids (Lillian Donovan (Maya Rudolph))
The Bucket List (Virginia Chambers (Beverly Todd))
The Cell (Dr. Miriam Kent (Marianne Jean-Baptiste))
Chocolat (Josephine Muscat (Lena Olin))
A Civil Action (Anne Anderson (Kathleen Quinlan))
CSI: NY (Stella Bonasera)
Diana (Oonagh Toffolo (Geraldine James))
The Division (Kate McCafferty)
Dune (Gaius Helen Mohiam (Charlotte Rampling))
EDtv (Cynthia Reed (Ellen DeGeneres))
Equity (Samantha Ryan (Alysia Reiner))
ER (Carol Hathaway (Julianna Margulies))
Fires (Kath Simpson (Miranda Otto))
Footloose (Vi Moore (Andie MacDowell))
Forrest Gump (Mrs. Gump (Sally Field))
Fortitude (Governor Hildur Odegard (Sofie Gråbøl))
From Hell (Liz Stride (Susan Lynch))
Glee (Sue Sylvester)
Godzilla (Dr. Elsie Chapman (Vicki Lewis))
Greta (Greta Hideg (Isabelle Huppert))
The Good Wife (Alicia Florrick (Julianna Margulies))
The Green Mile (Melinda Moores (Patricia Clarkson))
Hugo (Jehanne D'Alcy / Mama Jeanne (Helen McCrory))
Insomnia (Rachel Clement (Maura Tierney))
Into the Wild (Jan Burres (Catherine Keener))
JAG (Commander Alison Krennick)
Johnny English Strikes Again (Prime Minister of the United Kingdom (Emma Thompson))
Lincoln (Mary Todd Lincoln (Sally Field))
L.M. Montgomery's Anne of Green Gables (Marilla Cuthbert (Sara Botsford))
The Mists of Avalon (Morgaine)
Mr. Mercedes (Ida Silver (Holland Taylor))
The Muse (Laura Phillips (Andie MacDowell))
Spin City (Helen Winston (Deborah Rush))
The Squid and the Whale (Joan Berkman (Laura Linney))
Switched at Birth (Regina Vasquez)
Their Finest (Sophie Smith (Helen McCrory))
Transformers (Judy Witwicky (Julie White))
Transformers: Revenge of the Fallen (Judy Witwicky (Julie White))
Transformers: Dark of the Moon (Judy Witwicky (Julie White))
Treadstone (Petra Andropov (Gabrielle Scharnitzky))
Unforgotten (DCI Cassandra Stuart (Nicola Walker))
Win Win (Jackie Flaherty (Amy Ryan))

Animation
Arthur Christmas (Chief De Silva)
Steven Universe (Bismuth)

References

External links

1957 births
Living people
Voice actresses from Niigata Prefecture
Japanese voice actresses
Japanese video game actresses